The Kjellingstraumen Bridge is a suspension bridge that crosses the Kjellingsundet strait at the mouth of the Beiar Fjord in Gildeskål Municipality in Nordland county, Norway.

References

External links
A picture of the Kjellingstraumen Bridge

Gildeskål
Road bridges in Nordland
Bridges completed in 1975
Suspension bridges in Norway
1975 establishments in Norway
Norwegian County Road 17
Roads within the Arctic Circle